The 1951 Rhode Island Rams football team was an American football team that represented the University of Rhode Island as a member of the Yankee Conference during the 1951 college football season. It was the first and only season under head coach Ed Doherty, who took the job on a temporary basis after Hal Kopp was called to active duty in the United States Army. The team compiled a 3–5 record (1–3 against conference opponents), finished in fifth place out of six teams in the Yankee Conference, and was outscored by a total of 133 to 130. The team played its home games at Meade Stadium in Kingston, Rhode Island.

Schedule

References

Rhode Island
Rhode Island Rams football seasons
Rhode Island Rams football